NA-183 Taunsa is a constituency for the National Assembly of Pakistan.

Election 2002 

General elections were held on 10 Oct 2002. Khawaja Sheraz Mahmood of PML-Q won by 82,310 votes.

Election 2008 

General elections were held on 18 Feb 2008. Khawaja Sheraz Mehmood of PML-Q won by 74,628 votes.

Election 2013

Election 2018 

General elections are scheduled to be held on 25 July 2018.

See also
NA-182 Layyah-II
NA-184 Taunsa-cum-Dera Ghazi Khan

References

External links 
Election result's official website

NA-171